This is a list of notable people affiliated with New College, Oxford University, England, including former students, and current and former academics and fellows. The disproportionate amount of men on this list can be partially explained by the fact that for roughly 95% of its history (from its foundation in 1379 until 1979), women were barred from studying at New College.

Former students

Katharine Birbalsingh, Author, Headmistress and Founder of the Michaela Community School
Robert Alston, British diplomat
Jakie Astor, British Conservative Party politician and sportsman
Simon Baron-Cohen, professor of Developmental Psychopathology, University of Cambridge
Kate Beckinsale, actor
Tony Benn, Labour Party politician
Peter Bergen, political journalist and author
Tim Boswell, former Conservative MP
Gyles Brandreth, writer and broadcaster, former Conservative MP for Chester
David Butler, psephologist
Vikram Chandra, TV anchor
Henry Chichele, English archbishop
G. A. Cohen, political philosopher
Gary Cooper, musician and conductor
Michael Crick, journalist
John Macleod Campbell Crum, priest and hymnwriter
Sir T.W. Edgeworth David (1858–1934), Australian geologist, academic, polar explorer, soldier, public figure
Angus Deayton, comedian, actor, television presenter
William Douglas Home, dramatist and politician
John Fowles, novelist
Florian Henckel von Donnersmarck, German film director
Bill Durodie, academic, professor of risk analysis
John Farthing, Canadian philosopher and economist
Jonathan Fenby, journalist, writer and former Editor of The Observer and the South China Morning Post
Bram Fischer, South African lawyer, defended Nelson Mandela at the Rivonia Trial
Roland William Fleming, scientist
Hugh Gaitskell, Labour Party leader (1955–63)
Patrick Gale, novelist
John Galsworthy, novelist and playwright
John Gardner, Professor of Jurisprudence, University of Oxford
Robert P. George, Professor of Jurisprudence, Princeton University
Robert Goff, Baron Goff of Chieveley, British judge
Victor Gollancz, publisher
William Sealy Gosset, statistician
Hugh Grant, actor
Irfan Habib, Padma Bhushan, Indian historian; Emeritus Professor of History, Aligarh Muslim University, Aligarh
Mohammad Habib, Indian historian; Emeritus Professor of History, Aligarh Muslim University, Aligarh
General Sir John Hackett, soldier, university administrator
J. B. S. Haldane, biologist
William Reginald Halliday, historian and archaeologist 
Christopher Hampton, playwright and screenwriter
H. L. A. Hart, former Professor of Jurisprudence, University of Oxford 
Saiyid Nurul Hasan, Governor of West Bengal and Orissa
Arthur Cayley Headlam, theologian
Stephen Hetherington, philosopher
Peter Hobbs, novelist
Adrian Holman, British diplomat
William Howley, Archbishop of Canterbury (1828–48)
Thomas Hughes, footballer who won the FA Cup twice in the 1870s
The Ven. John Ingram, English Jesuit and martyr
Douglas Jardine, cricketer
Douglas Jay, British Labour Party politician
Robert Jay, Counsel to the Leveson Inquiry and now High Court Judge
Bobby Jindal, Governor of Louisiana
Brian Johnston, broadcaster and cricket commentator
Rachel Johnson, journalist 
Oliver Kamm, journalist, Times leader writer, former hedge fund manager
Ian Katz, journalist
Randal Keynes, conservationist
Sophie Kinsella, 'chick lit' novelist
Harold Laski, political scientist
Leopold George Wickham Legg, historian and editor of the Dictionary of National Biography
John Lennard, Professor of British and American Literature, University of the West Indies, Mona, Jamaica,
Andro Linklater (born 1944), historian
Bernard Longley, Roman Catholic Archbishop of Birmingham
Edward Luce, journalist
Charles McCreery, psychologist and author
Neil MacGregor, art historian, Director of the British Museum
Outram Marshall, clergyman, organising secretary of the Church Union
Dambudzo Marechera, Zimbabwean novelist
Brian G. Marsden, astronomer
Sir Henry Martin, MP for Oxford University, matr: New College, Oxford on 24 November 1581
Jamie McIntosh, Canadian abolitionist
Douglas McLean, rower in the Boat Race five times and winner at Henley Royal Regatta
Hector McLean, rowed in the Boat Race and won Silver Goblets at Henley Royal Regatta with his brother Douglas McLean
Michael Meacher, Labour Party politician
Sir Frank Meyer, businessman and Conservative MP
Nathaniel Micklem, Liberal Party politician
Nathaniel Micklem, theologian, son of the above
Peter Francis Middleton, pilot and grandfather of Catherine, Duchess of Cambridge
Alasdair Milne, BBC Director General (1982–87)
Kate Mosse, novelist
Sir Albert Napier, Permanent Secretary to the Lord Chancellor's Office
Sophie Newton, digital marketing entrepreneur 
Junzaburō Nishiwaki, Japanese poet
Richard Ollard, historian and biographer
Rageh Omaar, broadcast journalist
Frank R. Palmer, linguist, lecturer at the University of Reading
William Pargeter, eighteenth-century physician known for his interest in mental illness
G. L. Peiris, Sri Lankan politician and academic
Sally Phillips, actress and writer
Rob Porter, former White House Staff Secretary in the Trump administration
Dennis Potter, playwright and journalist
Gerald Priestland, broadcaster and journalist
Nigel Rees, broadcaster and author
Susan Rice, American diplomat
Sir Bernard Rix (Lord Justice Rix), Judge, a Lord Justice of Appeal 
Justine Roberts, founder CEO of Mumsnet and Gransnet
Alan Rodger, Baron Rodger of Earlsferry, Scottish-born Justice of the Supreme Court of the United Kingdom
Neil Rudenstine, former President of Harvard University
Oliver Russell, 2nd Baron Ampthill, peer, rower and administrator who served as the Governor of Madras
Anthony Russell-Roberts, businessman and opera manager
Jonathan Sacks, Chief Rabbi, United Hebrew Congregations of the Commonwealth
Madhavrao Scindia, Indian Cabinet Minister and Member of Parliament
Paul Seabright, economist
Tim Sebastian, broadcast journalist
Mel Smith, comedian and film director
Toby Spence, opera singer (tenor)
Rick Stein, chef, restaurateur and television presenter
William Stoughton, colonial American politician and judge
Sir Alexander Temple, landowner and MP
Adam Thirlwell, novelist
Frank Thompson, SOE officer
Alan Thornhill, sculptor
Daniel Topolski, rowing coach for Oxford, author of True Blue: The Oxford Boat Race Mutiny
Francis Turner, 17th century Bishop of Ely
Julian Turner, poet
David Verney, 21st Baron Willoughby de Broke, UKIP peer
William Warham, former Archbishiop of Canterbury
Robert Penn Warren, poet, novelist and literary critic
William Waynflete, founder of Magdalen College and Lord Chancellor of England 
Geoffrey Wheatcroft, journalist and author
M. Stanley Whittingham, lithium-ion battery pioneer and 2019 Nobel Prize in Chemistry laureate
Benjamin Whitaker Labour politician and former MP
John Edgar Wideman, American writer, professor at Brown University
Richard Wilberforce, Baron Wilberforce
A. N. Wilson, author and journalist
Naomi Wolf, American feminist
James Woodforde, clergyman
Lucy Worsley, historian, author and television presenter
Philip Ziegler, historian

Fellows and staff

A. J. Ayer, Wykeham Professor of logic
Isaiah Berlin
Alan Bullock
Paul Campbell
Raymond Carr
David Cecil
Richard Crossman
Richard Dawkins, Biology
Michael Dummett
Robin Lane Fox
J. B. S. Haldane (also an alumnus), Biology
W. D. Hamilton, Biology
G. H. Hardy
H. L. A. Hart
Nigel Hitchin
Julian Huxley, Biology
Willis Lamb
Hermione Lee
Jane Lightfoot
Rudolf Peierls
Craig Raine
Marcus du Sautoy
Jane Shaw
Jeremy Sheehy, Dean of Divinity
Joe Silk
William Archibald Spooner
Christopher Tolkien
Harold Wilson

References

External links
 Emeritus, Honorary and Wykeham Fellows, New College, Oxford

 
 
New College